Raong is a Bahnaric language of northeastern Cambodia. It may be a variety of Stieng, another Austroasiatic language spoken in Vietnam and Cambodia (Barr & Pawley 2013).

Raong is spoken in Ou Am village, Srae Khtum commune, Kaev Seima District, Mondulkiri Province, Cambodia.

References

Barr, Julie and Eric Pawley. 2013. Bahnaric Language Cluster survey of Mondul Kiri and Kratie Provinces, Cambodia. SIL International.

Bahnaric languages
Languages of Cambodia